The 2008 World University Cycling Championship is the 5th Word University Cycling Championship sponsored by the International University Sports Federation (FISU) and sanctioned by the Union Cycliste Internationale (UCI). The championship took place in Nijmegen, Netherlands from 21 to 25 May 2008. Prague, Czech Republic and Bangkok, Thailand were also candidate cities to organize the championship. The NOC*NSF chairman Erica Terpstra opened he World Championships at the opening ceremony on 21 May. Athletes from 25 countries competed in the disciplines mountain bike cross-country, mountain bike marathon, individual time trial and road race. It was the first time in student sports that there was held a World Championship Mountain Biking.

Participation
Each country was allowed to enter a maximum of 20 competitors: 4 men and women in the road race events and 6 men and women in the mountain bike events. A person was allowed to participate as a competitor if he/she was born between 1 January 1980 and 31 December 1990 and was a full-time student at a university or similar institute or had obtained their academic degree in the year preceding the event.

Cycling disciplines
The championship contained events in following sports:

Road cycling (road race, time trial)
The road cycling competitions at the 2008 World University Cycling Championship were held at 23 and 25 May 2008. Athletes from 23 different countries competed in the road race and the individual time trial. The competitions took place in the countryside of Nijmeten with un-Dutch difference in altitude and was along the dikes of the river Waal. You can view on YouTube the road race course and the time trial course.

Mountain biking (cross-country, marathon)
The mountain bike competitions at the 2008 World University Cycling Championship were held at 22 and 24 May 2008. Athletes competed in the disciplines cross-country and marathon. 26 men athletes competed in the marathon and 32 in the cross-country. The competitions took place in the wooded areas of Groesbeek, nearby the German Reichswald. The mountain bike track was specially made for this championship.

Schedule
 Wednesday, 21 May 2008
 Opening ceremony
 Thursday, 22 May 2008
 Mountain bike: women's cross-country
 Mountain bike: men's cross-country
 Friday, 23 May 2008
 Road cycling: women's time trial, 34.8 km
 Road cycling: men's time trial, 34.8 km
 Saturday, 24 May 2008
 Mountain bike: women's marathon
 Mountain bike: men's marathon, 104 km
 Sunday 25 May 2008
 Road cycling: women's road race, 96.3 km
 Road cycling: men's road race, 160.5 km

Events summary

Road Cycling

Mountainbiking

Medal table 
The mountain bike marathon events are not included in the medal table.

References

External links
International University Sports Federation – Cycling

World University Cycling Championships
World Championships
World Championships
World Championships
International cycle races hosted by the Netherlands
Mountain biking events
Cycling
2008 in mountain biking
Mountain biking events in the Netherlands
Cycling in Nijmegen